Puthandiya is a 2016 Sri Lankan Sinhala action thriller film directed by Thrishula Deepa Thambawita and co-produced by Samantha Meella and Methsiri Kumarasinghe. It stars Jeevan Kumaratunga, Buddhika Jayaratne, and Himali Siriwardena in lead roles along with Nehara Peiris and Dharmapriya Dias. Music composed by Sarath de Alwis. It is the 971st Sri Lankan film in the Sinhala cinema.

Plot

Cast
 Jeevan Kumaratunga as Dharmaratne aka "Dharme"
 Buddhika Jayaratne as Vimukthi Dharmaratne
 Himali Siriwardena as Veena
 Nehara Peiris as Samanmalee
 Dharmapriya Dias as Ajith
 Arjuna Kamalanath as Podde
 Nihal Fernando as Sirisoma
 Vasantha Vittachchi as Bandarathilake
 Duleeka Marapana as Ajith's mother
 Jayani Senanayake as Dharme's wife
 Dhananjaya Siriwardena as Kapila
 Chathura Perera as Mohammad
 Sarath Dikkumbura as Upendra
 Udaya Shantha Liyanage as Raju
 Menaka Rajapakse as himself in cameo appearance

Soundtrack

References

2016 films
2010s Sinhala-language films